Farancia is a genus of colubrid snakes. It consists of two species, one commonly referred to as the rainbow snake (F. erytrogramma) and the other commonly referred to as the mud snake (F. abacura). Both species are native to the southeastern United States.

Description
Adult specimens of Farancia species are usually to 36-54 inches (92–137 cm) in total length (including tail). They are usually dark brown or black dorsally, with a brightly colored underside that is red or orange. Rainbow snakes exhibit red striping down their backs.

The body of Farancia species is cylindrical, robust, and muscular. The smooth, shiny, and iridescent dorsal scales are arranged in 19 rows at midbody. The tail is short, ending in a spine.

Behaviour
Snakes of the genus Farancia are semiaquatic, living in the muddy edges of slow moving, permanent water sources.

Diet
The diet of Farancia species consists primarily of amphiumas, eels, and sirens.

Reproduction
In Farancia breeding occurs in early spring, and eggs are laid in a burrow near the water in early summer. The clutch incubates between 8–12 weeks, and hatches in mid-autumn.

Species and subspecies
Farancia abacura – Alabama, Arkansas, Florida, Georgia, Illinois, Kentucky, Louisiana, Mississippi, Missouri, North Carolina, South Carolina, Tennessee, Texas, and Virginia.
Farancia abacura abacura  – eastern mud snake
Farancia abacura reinwardtii  – western mud snake
Farancia erytrogramma – Alabama, Florida, Georgia, Louisiana, Maryland, Mississippi, North Carolina, South Carolina, and Virginia.
Farancia erytrogramma erytrogramma  – rainbow snake
Farancia erytrogramma seminola  – Florida rainbow snake

References

Further reading
Goin CJ, Goin OB, Zug GR (1978). Introduction to Herpetology, Third Edition. San Francisco: W.H. Freeman and Company. xi + 378 pp. . (Genus Farancia, p. 323).
Gray JE (1842). "Monographic Synopsis of the Water Snakes, or the Family H". Zoological Miscellany [2]: 59–68. (Farancia, new genus, p. 68).

External links
Herps of Texas: Farancia abacura

Farancia
Snake genera
Taxa named by John Edward Gray
Reptiles described in 1842
Reptiles of the United States